The Smyrniote crusades (1343–1351) were two Crusades sent by Pope Clement VI against the Emirate of Aydin under Umur Bey which had as their principal target the coastal city of Smyrna in Asia Minor.

The first Smyrniote crusade was the brainchild of Clement VI. The threat of Turkish piracy in the Aegean Sea had induced Clement's predecessors, John XXII and Benedict XII, to maintain a fleet of four galleys there to defend Christian shipping but starting in the 1340s Clement endeavoured with Venetian aid to expand this effort into a full military expedition. He commissioned Henry of Asti, the Catholic patriarch of Constantinople, to organise a league against the Turks, who had increased their piracy in the Aegean in recent years. Hugh IV of Cyprus and the Order of the Hospital joined and on 2 November 1342, the Pope sent letters to engage the men and ships of Venice. The Papal bull granting the Crusade indulgence and authorising its preaching throughout Europe, Insurgentibus contra fidem, was published on 30 September.

The first Smyrniote crusade began with the naval victory of the Battle of Pallene and ended with an assault on Smyrna, capturing the harbour and the citadel but not the acropolis, on 28 October 1344. In a gesture of over-confidence, on 17 January 1345 Henry of Asti attempted to celebrate mass in an abandoned structure which he believed had been the cathedral of the metropolitan. In the middle of the service Umur Bey swept down on the congregation and the leaders of the crusade were killed, including the Patriarch, Martino Zaccaria, commander of the Papal galleys and the Venetian commander, Pietro Zeno.

The precarious situation of the Crusaders in Asia spurred the Pope to organise a second expedition in 1345. In November, under the command of Humbert II of Viennois, the second Smyrniote crusade set out from Venice. In February 1346 it won a victory over the Turks at Mytilene but Humbert did little more at Smyrna than sortie against the Turks and refortify the Christian section of the city. The next five years were occupied by Clement VI with attempts to negotiate a truce with the Turks, who kept Smyrna in a constant state of siege by land and direct financial and military aid to the city. Although Clement's concern with the Crusade ended abruptly in September 1351, the city of Smyrna remained in Christian hands until the Siege of Smyrna by the Timurids in 1402.

References

Further reading
 Carr, Mike. 2014. "Humbert of Viennois and the Crusade of Smyrna: A Reconsideration". Crusades 13 (1): 237–51.
 Gay, Jules. 1904. Le pape Clément VI et les affaires d'Orient. PhD thesis.

 
Medieval Smyrna
14th century in Asia
Aydınids
Wars involving the Papal States
Wars involving the Republic of Venice
Wars involving the Kingdom of Cyprus
Wars involving the Knights Hospitaller
1340s conflicts